Gary Scott Buckels (born July 22, 1965) is an American former professional baseball pitcher. He played during one season in Major League Baseball (MLB) for the St. Louis Cardinals.

Career
Now he is a catching and pitching coach in Huntington Beach, California.

References
"Gary Buckels". Society for American Baseball Research. Retrieved on 14 March 2009.
"Gary Buckels Statistics". Baseball-Reference. Retrieved on 14 March 2009.

1965 births
Living people
American expatriate baseball players in Canada
Baseball players from California
Cal State Fullerton Titans baseball players
Edmonton Trappers players
Louisville Redbirds players
Major League Baseball pitchers
Midland Angels players
People from La Mirada, California
Quad Cities Angels players
Salem Angels players
St. Louis Cardinals players
St. Petersburg Cardinals players
Toledo Mud Hens players